Succinea tenella is a species of air-breathing land snail, a terrestrial pulmonate gastropod mollusc in the family Succineidae, the amber snails.

Distribution
This species is already established in the USA, and is considered to represent a potentially serious threat as  a pest, an invasive species which could negatively affect agriculture, natural ecosystems, human health or commerce. Therefore it has been suggested that this species be given top national quarantine significance in the USA.

References

 hawaiilandsnails.lifedesks.org/pages/558/pdf  Authority and date info

Succineidae
Gastropods described in 1865